CODB may refer to:

 Component-oriented database
 City of Daytona Beach, Florida, US, website name and short form on forms